December Avenue is a 5-piece indie pop/alternative rock band from Manila, Philippines known for their viral compositions online. The band is one of the most streamed OPM bands of all-time. The band is composed of Zel Bautista on vocals and guitars, Jem Manuel on guitars, Don Gregorio on bass, Jet Danao on drums and backing vocals, and Gelo Cruz on keyboards and backing vocals.

Bautista, Manuel, Gregorio, and Danao started out in their alma mater University of Santo Tomas in 2007. Cruz, an alumnus of De La Salle-College of St. Benilde, was later added in 2016. Bautista is the chief composer of the band. Originally known for their predominantly English songs, the band has released Tagalog songs since 2016.

Members

 Members
Zel Bautista – vocals, acoustic guitar 
Jem Manuel – lead guitar 
Don Gregorio – bass guitar 
Jet Danao – drums, percussion, backing vocals 
Gelo Cruz – keyboards, backing vocals 
 Touring substitutes
 Jaco Sosmeña – drums, percussion
 Eo Marcos – drums, percussion 
 Carissa Ramos – bass guitar

Discography

Studio albums
December Avenue (2016)
Langit Mong Bughaw (2019)

EPs
Time To Go (2010)
Sleep Tonight (2011)

Awards and nominations

References

External links

Filipino rock music groups
Musical groups from Metro Manila
Musical groups established in 2007